Federico A. Moreira Wuilman (born 8 March 1961, in Salto) is a retired road bicycle racer and track cyclist from Uruguay.

Moreira represented his native country at two consecutive Summer Olympics, starting in 1988.  He also won the gold medal in the Men's Points Race at the 1987 Pan American Games. Moreira won the 1985 edition of the Vuelta Ciclista de Chile. He also won 6 editions of the Vuelta del Uruguay.

References

External links

1961 births
Living people
Uruguayan male cyclists
Cyclists at the 1987 Pan American Games
Cyclists at the 1988 Summer Olympics
Cyclists at the 1992 Summer Olympics
Cyclists at the 1999 Pan American Games
Olympic cyclists of Uruguay
Uruguayan track cyclists
Uruguayan people of Portuguese descent
Sportspeople from Salto, Uruguay
Pan American Games gold medalists for Uruguay
Pan American Games medalists in cycling
Medalists at the 1987 Pan American Games